Changa Bangial is a town and Union Council, an administrative subdivision, of Gujar Khan Tehsil in the Punjab Province of Pakistan.

Location 
It is the collective name of 17 Dhoks (settlements) with distinctive names, such as Bharole, Dhanda, Sabbar and Changa Maira.  It is about seven miles from the tehsil capital Gujar Khan midway on the road to Kallar Syedan and is located at 33°19'60N 73°19'60E. The area it occupies is quite extensive.

Mauza Daryal is a cluster of four smaller villages ( Mohra peeru wala, Dohok Chohan, Morha Bajnial and Morha Daryal) on the northern edge of the Union Council. Two more main Dhokes in Changa Bangyal are Dhok Kamager and Dhok Jhaag.

Changa Maira, Mal Awan and Bhagsana are also villages of the Union Council Changa Bangyal.

Demography 
Its population is estimated to be 10,000 persons.

Large community of its residents reside in UK, middle east, Canada, and other countries of Europe.

People
Muhammad Fazal Khan Changwi (1868-1938)
Mohammad Amir - Pakistani International cricketer

References 
Raja Aziz Ud Din Ahmed, Senior Advocate Supreme Court of Pakistan, Ex President High Court Bar Association Rawalpindi Bench Pakistan

External links

Populated places in Gujar Khan Tehsil
Union councils of Gujar Khan Tehsil
Towns in Gujar Khan Tehsil